KC and the Sunshine Band is the second studio album by KC and the Sunshine Band. The record was produced by Harry Wayne Casey and Richard Finch and was released in July 1975 on the TK label.

History
KC and the Sunshine Band contains two of the group's biggest hits, "That's the Way (I Like It)" and "Get Down Tonight", both of which reached No. 1 on the Billboard Hot 100 and the R&B Singles Chart. The song "Boogie Shoes" also subsequently became a hit in early 1978 after being included on the Saturday Night Fever soundtrack.

The album was remastered and reissued with bonus tracks in 2012 by Big Break Records.

Track listing

Personnel
Harry Wayne Casey – keyboards, vocals
Jerome Smith – guitar
Richard Finch – bass guitar, drum, percussion
Robert Johnson – drums
Oliver C. Brown – percussion
Fermin Goytisolo – percussion
Ken Faulk – trumpet
Vinnie Tanno – trumpet
Mike Lewis – tenor saxophone
Whit Sidener – baritone saxophone
Beverly Champion – background vocals
Margaret Reynolds – background vocals
Jeanette Williams – background vocals

Charts

Weekly charts

Year-end charts

Certifications

See also
List of Billboard number-one R&B albums of 1975

References

External links

1975 albums
KC and the Sunshine Band albums
TK Records albums